Ahmed El Aouad (born 27 November 1971) is a retired French-Moroccan footballer.  An attacking midfielder, El Aouad played for most of his career in Luxembourg, for CS Hobscheid, CS Grevenmacher, F91 Dudelange, and CS Fola Esch.

He won the award for Luxembourgian Footballer of the Year, awarded to the best player in the National Division, twice: once whilst with CS Hobscheid (2001) and again with CS Grevenmacher (2003).  He also played for F91 Dudelange, with whom he won the championship.  His best goal-scoring tally was in 2004-05, when he scored 13 goals in the league, placing him joint-sixth in the goalscoring charts overall.

Honours
Luxembourg National Division: 2
 2003, 2006

Luxembourg Cup: 2
 2003, 2006

Luxembourgian Footballer of the Year: 2
 2001, 2003

Footnotes

External links
 Roster - CS Fola

1971 births
Living people
French sportspeople of Moroccan descent
Moroccan footballers
French footballers
CS Grevenmacher players
F91 Dudelange players
CS Fola Esch players
Expatriate footballers in Luxembourg
Association football midfielders